Mastixia arborea is a species of plant in the Nyssaceae family. It is found in India and Sri Lanka.

References

arborea
Least concern plants
Taxonomy articles created by Polbot